Clinton D. Vernon (April 22, 1907 – September 16, 1987) was an American politician who served as the Attorney General of Utah from 1949 to 1953.

References

1907 births
1987 deaths
Utah Attorneys General
Utah Democrats